TransBunbury is the public bus transportation system in Bunbury, Western Australia, consisting of 10 public routes as well as 30 school routes.

History

Bunbury City Transit was established in January 1986. On 2 May 2011 it was rebranded as TransBunbury.

Operations
Until 31 December 2014, the service was operated by South West Coach Lines. Upon being re-tendered, it passed to Swan Transit, with a new 10-year contract commencing on 1 January 2015.

The SmartRider card is valid for use on TransBunbury services.

Terminus
TransBunbury's main terminus is the Bunbury Bus Station, located in central Bunbury.

Fleet

As at September 2020, TransBunbury operates a fleet of 37 buses, consisting of a mixture of Volvo B7RLE, Mercedes Benz OC500LE and Mercedes-Benz O405NH buses, all of which are ex-Transperth. Upon being rebranded as TransBunbury in May 2011 the Bunbury City Transit white and blue livery was replaced by Transperth's silver and green livery.

References

External links
Public Transport Authority
Transdev South West
Showbus gallery

Bus companies of Western Australia
1986 establishments in Australia
Bunbury, Western Australia